Tikhon Yakovlevich Kiselyov (12 August (O.S.: 30 July), 191711 January 1983) was a Belarusian statesman in the Soviet Union, the leader (first secretary) of the Communist Party of Byelorussia, i.e., the de facto leader of the Byelorussian SSR (1980–1983).

Career

Party
1940: member of the CPSU
1961: member of the CPSU Central Committee
1980: first secretary of Central Committee the Communist Party of Byelorussia
1980: CPSU Central Committee Politbureau candidate

Government
1954: member of the Supreme Soviet of the USSR
1959-1978: Chairman of the BSSR Council of Ministers
1978-1980: Deputy Chairman of the USSR Council of Ministers
1981: member of the Presidium of the Supreme Soviet of the USSR

Awards
 1977: Hero of Socialist Labor
 Two Orders of Lenin
Order of the Badge of Honor
Medals

References

Career data are taken from the Large Encyclopedic Dictionary (Moscow, 1991)

1917 births
1983 deaths
People from Dobruš District
People from Gomelsky Uyezd
Politburo of the Central Committee of the Communist Party of the Soviet Union candidate members
Fourth convocation members of the Soviet of Nationalities
Fifth convocation members of the Soviet of Nationalities
Sixth convocation members of the Soviet of the Union
Seventh convocation members of the Soviet of the Union
Eighth convocation members of the Soviet of the Union
Ninth convocation members of the Soviet of the Union
Tenth convocation members of the Soviet of the Union
Heads of the Communist Party of Byelorussia
Prime Ministers of Belarus
Heroes of Socialist Labour
Recipients of the Order of Lenin
Deaths from cancer in Belarus